The 2013–14 Coupe de la Ligue was the 20th edition of the French league cup competition. The competition was organized by the Ligue de Football Professionnel and was open to the 44 professional clubs in France that are managed by the organization.

The defending champions were Saint-Étienne, who defeated Rennes 1–0 in the final of the previous season. They were eliminated in the Last 16 by eventual champions Paris Saint-Germain, who won their record fourth title by defeating Lyon 2–1 in the final.

The winner of the competition should have qualified for the 2014–15 UEFA Europa League and be inserted into the third qualifying round, but Paris Saint-Germain had already qualified for the Champions League via their league position.

First round
First round matches were held over 2 days; 6 & 7 of August 2013. The 11 winners secure places in the second round.

Second round 
The round featured the 12 winners of the first round matches. The matches were contested on 27 August 2013.

Third round
The round features the 6 winners of the second round matches in addition to 14 Ligue 1 clubs didn't participate in the European competitions. The matches were contested on 29 & 30 October 2013.

Round of 16 

The draw for the Round of 16 of the 2013–14 edition of the Coupe de la Ligue was held on 7 November 2013. The round featured the ten winners of the third round matches and the six Ligue 1 clubs that qualify for European competition in the 2012–13 season. The matches were contested on 17 and 18 December 2013.

Quarter-finals 

The draw for the quarter-finals of the 2013–14 edition of the Coupe de la Ligue was held on 18 December 2013 following the conclusion of the Round of 16 matches. The round featured the eight winners of the Round of 16 matches and were contested on 14 and 15 January 2014.

Semi-finals 

The draw for the semifinals of the 2013–14 edition of the Coupe de la Ligue was held on 15 January 2014 following the conclusion of the quarterfinal matches. The round features the 4 winners of the quarterfinal matches and will be contested on 4 and 5 February 2014.

Final

See also
 2013–14 Ligue 1
 2013–14 Ligue 2

References

External links
 Official site  

Coupe de la Ligue seasons
France
League Cup